Pau Casadesús Castro (born 30 October 2003) is a Spanish footballer who plays as a right back for RCD Espanyol B, on loan from FC Andorra.

Club career
Born in Vallirana, Barcelona, Catalonia, Casadesús represented Club Gimnàstic Manresa as a youth, and also began to train with the first team of FC Andorra in 2021, one year after a collaboration agreement between the two clubs was arranged. He made his senior debut with the latter club on 30 November 2021, coming on as a late substitute for Adrià Altimira in a 1–0 away win over Náxara CD, for the season's Copa del Rey.

Casadesús made his professional debut on 15 August 2022, replacing Carlos Martínez and scoring a last-minute winner in a 1–0 away win over Real Oviedo; it was also Andorra's first goal in a professional competition. The following 20 January, he was loaned to Segunda Federación side RCD Espanyol B until the end of the season.

References

External links

2003 births
Living people
People from Baix Llobregat
Sportspeople from the Province of Barcelona
Spanish footballers
Footballers from Catalonia
Association football defenders
Segunda División players
Primera Federación players
FC Andorra players
RCD Espanyol B footballers
Spanish expatriate footballers
Expatriate footballers in Andorra
Spanish expatriate sportspeople in Andorra